Penryn is a co-educational, English-medium private school situated in Nelspruit, Mpumalanga, South Africa. It is also a global member of Round Square. Penryn was officially started in 1991 in a Methodist church in Plaston, Mpumalanga, with 13 pupils and 2 teachers, as a sister school to St Stithians College in Randburg, Johannesburg. Two years later, the college moved to its own campus on Boschrand Ridge, where it was officially opened by Enos Mabuza.

Name 
Penryn is named after Penryn, Cornwall. The name Penryn means "Top of the Hill" in the Cornish language. The college is indeed situated on top of a hill. This is often used as a metaphor by Penryn when it refers to itself as the light on the hill. A reference to it seeing itself as being a light of hope on the hill. Penryn was renamed from Penryn College in 2018.

Sports
Sports played at Penryn College include:
 Archery
 Athletics
 Basketball
 Canoeing
 Diving
 Equestrian
 Fencing
 Golf
 Hockey
 Rowing
 Rugby
 Shooting
 Softball
 Soccer
 Swimming
 Table tennis
 Tennis
 Water polo

See also
Independent Schools Association of Southern Africa

References

External links 

High schools in Mpumalanga
Private schools in Mpumalanga
Round Square schools